Statistics of Allsvenskan in season 1936/1937.

Overview
The league was contested by 12 teams, with AIK winning the championship.

League table

Results

Footnotes

References 

Allsvenskan seasons
1936–37 in Swedish association football leagues
Sweden